Unidad Deportiva Acapulco (English:Acapulco Sports Complex) is a sports complex composed of a 13,000-seat soccer and track and field stadium and a baseball stadium which can seat thousands.  The soccer/track stadium, which originally seated 8,600, is currently home to the Águilas UAGro soccer team of the Mexican Tercera División, which began play in 2009.  The baseball stadium is currently used for amateur and semi-pro baseball, and skateboarding.

The complex had been in poor condition for several years but has received major renovations in recent years.  The grass fields were replaced in 2009 with artificial turf.  Additionally, the bathrooms, locker rooms and offices have been refurbished, and a new roof was installed on the soccer/track stadium's main grandstand.  The cost of the renovations was $2.5 million pesos.  The complex was completed in 1975.

The complex also includes an Olympic-sized swimming pool and basketball courts.

Other events that have been held at the complex have been track meets, concerts, lucha libre, and boxing.  Should Acapulco receive a Mexican Baseball League expansion team, the baseball stadium could either be expanded or rebuilt to seat over 10,000.  And should los Guerreros be promoted to the Liga de Ascenso the soccer/track stadium could be expanded to seat as many as 19,000, and should the team be promoted to the Primera Division de Mexico, additional construction could push the soccer/track stadium's capacity to as high as twice its current capacity.

References

Baseball venues in Mexico
Football venues in Mexico
Acapulco
Sports venues in Guerrero